The Pukekohe 500 was an endurance motor racing event first held in 1963 at Pukekohe Park Raceway, Pukekohe, New Zealand.

History
The Pukekohe 500 had its origins in the Wills Six-Hour race that was first held in 1963 as a production car race, soon after the circuit opened. From 1967, the event mandated that New Zealand-built production cars can only be entered into the race. Through the first decades of the race, the event became recognised as the second most significant race on the New Zealand motorsport calendar behind the New Zealand Grand Prix. In the early 1980s, a three race endurance series was held with races also at Bay Park Raceway and Manfeild.

In the mid 1980s, the race rose to international prominence when it adopted Group A touring car regulations and was linked with the Wellington 500 street race. The two races attracted Group A racing teams from Australia, Europe and Asia though until the end of the Group A era in the early 1990s. The 1988 round was part of the Asia-Pacific Touring Car Championship with Wellington, the Bathurst 1000 in Australia and the Fuji 500. The 1993 and 1994 events were held to Super Touring regulations before dropping off the calendar altogether with the demise of the Wellington 500.

From 2001, the predominant touring car event at Pukekohe was superseded by the Auckland SuperSprint, an round of the Australian Supercars Championship series held at the circuit. However, the Pukekohe 500 name was revived in 2012 as a V8SuperTourer endurance event, albeit held over three races. The meeting proved popular with large crowds attending. Greg Murphy rekindled his success from the V8 Supercars era at Pukekohe by winning two of the three races. The V8SuperTourer series folded in 2015 and with it the running of the Pukekohe 500.

The event was revived in 2019 as a production event. In 2020, Mark Leonard and Peter Sprague, descendants of Leo Leonard and Ernie and Gary Sprague who won the race a combined 14 times, entered the race. After the 2021 race was cancelled due to the COVID-19 pandemic, the event was held for a final time in 2022 prior to the circuit's closure in 2023.

Winners

Notes
  – Two separate events were held in 1987.

Multiple winners

By driver

By manufacturer

Event sponsors
 1963–67: Wills
 1968–84, 1987: Benson & Hedges
 1988: ProMo
 1989–93: Nissan-Mobil
 2012: Woodstock
 2013: Mike Pero
 2014: Fuchs

See also
 Wellington 500
 Auckland SuperSprint

References

Auto races in New Zealand
Recurring sporting events established in 1984
Touring car races